was a town located in Kitaadachi District, Saitama Prefecture, Japan.

As of 2003, the town had an estimated population of 28,124 and a density of 1,869.95 persons per km². The total area was 15.04 km².

On October 1, 2005, Fukiage, along with the town of Kawasato (from Kitasaitama District), was merged in the expanded city of Kōnosu.

Dissolved municipalities of Saitama Prefecture
Kōnosu